Colonel Walter Howard Tunbridge,  (2 November 1856 – 11 October 1943) was an Australian soldier and architect.

Biography
Tunbridge was born in Dover, Kent, to bricklayer John Nicholas Tunbridge and Anne, née Denne. Educated at Eythorne, he migrated to Australia in 1884 and established himself as an architect in Townsville, where he would eventually establish the civil engineering, architecture and surveying firm Tunbridge & Tunbridge. In February 1889 he was commissioned in the Mounted Infantry of the Queensland Land Forces, and in December was promoted lieutenant. He and his unit were sent to keep order at the 1891 shearers' strike, and in June 1892 Tunbridge was promoted captain. In November 1898 he was promoted major and transferred to the Queensland Artillery Garrison Battery, serving in South Africa from 1900 and commanding the 3rd Mounted Infantry Contingent. He saw action at Elands River and Rhenoster Kop. He served with distinction and was mentioned in despatches, appointed Companion of the Order of the Bath, awarded the Queen's South Africa Medal with five clasps and promoted brevet lieutenant-colonel. He returned to Australia in 1902 and served as aide-de-camp to the Governor-General.

On 7 April 1904 Tunbridge married Leila Emily Brown in Brisbane, and later extended his firm to include a Melbourne branch, where he based himself until 1914. Appointed censor for the 3rd Military District in August 1914, he was swiftly promoted to deputy chief censor and before the month was out returned to the military as a lieutenant-colonel in the Australian Imperial Force. Given command of the 1st Australian Division Ammunition Park (Mechanical Transport), Tunbridge and his units arrived in England in February 1915, where they were incorporated into the British Army as the 300th and 301st Mechanical Transport Companies and sent to France in July. Influential in various reorganisations of the mechanical transport units, Tunbridge was appointed to command the 1 Anzac Corps Ammunition Park on 25 April 1916 and following a reorganisation in January 1917 became senior mechanical operator of the 1 Anzac Corps. During the Third Battle of Ypres his responsibilities covered the entire AIF contingent in France.

In June 1918 Tunbridge was promoted colonel; he retired in January 1920 and was formally retired from the AIF in June. He had been mentioned in despatches five times during the war and was appointed Companion of the Order of St Michael and St George in 1917, Commander of the Order of the British Empire in 1919 and brevet colonel of the Australian Military Forces. He returned to architecture until his retirement in the 1930s. Tunbridge died at Hawthorn in 1943 and was survived by his wife and three children.

References

1856 births
1943 deaths
19th-century Australian architects
20th-century Australian architects
Australian Army officers
Australian military personnel of the Second Boer War
Australian military personnel of World War I
Burials at Box Hill Cemetery
Commanders of the Order of the British Empire
Companions of the Order of St Michael and St George
Companions of the Order of the Bath
English emigrants to Australia
People from Dover, Kent